Rankin is a last name of Scottish and English origin, brought to Ireland by the Plantation of Ulster. The name is derived from the medieval personal name Rankin, which is a diminutive of Ronald or Rand, combined with the diminutive suffix kin.

People with the last name
 Alan Rankin, sound editor
 Annabelle Rankin, Australian senator
 Arabella Rankin, Scottish artist
 Arthur Rankin, surveyor, entrepreneur and political figure in Canada West
 Arthur Rankin, Jr., who worked on Rankin/Bass animation studios with Jules Bass
 Arthur E. Rankin (1888-1962), American politician
 Arthur Rankin (footballer) (1904–1962), Scottish footballer
 Bobby Rankin (1905–1954), Scottish football player and manager (St. Mirren FC)
 Boyd Rankin, Irish cricketer
 Brian Robson Rankin, professional name of Hank Marvin (born 1941), lead guitarist of the Shadows
 Chris Rankin, New Zealand actor
 Christopher Rankin, U.S. Representative from Mississippi
 Claire Rankin, Canadian actress
 Darrell Rankin (born 1957), leader of the Communist Party of Canada-Manitoba and peace activist
 David Rankin (disambiguation), several people
 Doris Rankin (1887-1947), American actress
 Frank Rankin, Canadian ice hockey player
 George Rankin, Australian Major General, DSO and Bar
 George Claus Rankin, Anglo-Indian judge
 Harry Rankin, Canadian lawyer from Vancouver
 Holly Rankin (born 1991), professional name of Jack River, Australian singer-songwriter
 Isaiah Rankin, English footballer
 Ian Rankin (disambiguation), several people including
 Ian Rankin, Scottish crime author
 J. Lee Rankin, U.S. Solicitor General
 James Rankin (disambiguation), several people
 James Rankin (lighthouse keeper) (1844–1921), Irish-born American lighthouse keeper
 Sir James Rankin, 1st Baronet (1842–1915), British politician
 Janice Rankin (born 1972), Scottish curler
 Jeannette Rankin (1880–1973), the first female member of Congress, voted against entry into World War I, promoter of woman suffrage and social legislation, and the only member of Congress to vote against United States entry into World War II
 Jennifer Rankin (1941–1979), Australian poet and playwright
John Rankin (disambiguation), several people
 John Rankin (abolitionist) (1793–1886), American Presbyterian minister, educator and abolitionist
 John E. Rankin (1882–1960), United States Representative from Mississippi
 John Rankin (British politician) (1890–1973), Scottish Member of Parliament 1955–1973
 John Rankin (footballer, born 1983) (born 1983), Scottish footballer
 Jon Rankin, Caymanian athlete 
 Jordan Rankin, Australian rugby league footballer
 Judy Rankin, American golfer
 Kenny Rankin, American jazz singer
 Kyle Rankin, American film director
 Lou Rankin, American sculptor
 Martinas Rankin, American football player
 Matthew Rankin, Canadian experimental filmmaker
 Melinda Rankin (1811–1888), American missionary, teacher, and writer
Molly Rankin, lead singer of the indie pop band Alvvays
 Murray Rankin, Canadian lawyer, academic and politician
 Naomi Rankin, leader of the Communist Party of Alberta
 Nell Rankin, American opera singer
 Patricia Rankin, British particle physicist
 Paul Rankin, Irish celebrity chef, a mainstay of Ready Steady Cook
 Richard Rankin, Scottish actor
 Robert Rankin (disambiguation), several people
 Sir Robert Rankin, 1st Baronet (1877–1960), shipbuilder and British politician
 Robert Rankin (born 1949), British science fiction and fantasy author
 Robert Alexander Rankin (1915–2001), Scottish mathematician
 Robert William Rankin (1907–1942), Australian naval officer
 Sue Rankin (born 1956), American academic
 John Gilbert "Tex" Rankin (1894-1947), American aviator
 Lt Col William Rankin (1920–2009), the only known person to survive a fall from the top of a cumulonimbus thunderstorm cloud

Other
 The Rankin Family, Canadian folk music group

People with the given name
Adam Rankin Alexander, member of the US House of Representatives for Tennessee
John Rankin Franklin, Maryland congressional representative
John Rankin Gamble, American lawyer
John Rathbone (John Rankin Rathbone Sr.), English politician
John Rankin Rogers, the third governor of the state of Washington
Rankin (photographer) (originally John Rankin Waddell), a British portrait and fashion photographer
Tim Rankin Rathbone, English politician
William Rankin Ballard, American pioneer and land developer
Rankin Gibson, American lawyer and politician

People with the middle name
 	
Richard Rankin Fellers (born 1959), American Olympic equestrian

See also
Ranken

References